This page lists all described species of the spider family Miturgidae accepted by the World Spider Catalog :

A

Argoctenus

Argoctenus L. Koch, 1878
 A. aureus (Hogg, 1911) — New Zealand
 A. australianus (Karsch, 1878) — Australia (New South Wales)
 A. bidentatus (Main, 1954) — Australia (Western Australia)
 A. devisi Rainbow, 1898 — New Guinea
 A. gracilis (Hickman, 1950) — Australia (South Australia)
 A. hystriculus Simon, 1909 — Australia (Western Australia)
 A. igneus L. Koch, 1878 (type) — Australia (Western Australia)
 A. nebulosus Simon, 1909 — Australia (Western Australia)
 A. pectinatus Hogg, 1900 — Australia (Victoria)
 A. pictus L. Koch, 1878 — Australia
 A. vittatus (Rainbow, 1920) — Australia (Lord Howe Is.)
 A. vittatus (Simon, 1889) — Australia, New Caledonia

D

Diaprograpta

Diaprograpta Simon, 1909
 D. abrahamsae Raven, 2009 — Australia (Queensland)
 D. alfredgodfreyi Raven, 2009 — Australia (Victoria)
 D. hirsti Raven, 2009 — Australia (South Australia)
 D. peterandrewsi Raven, 2009 — Australia (Queensland)
 D. striola Simon, 1909 (type) — Australia (Western Australia)

E

Elassoctenus

Elassoctenus Simon, 1909
 E. harpax Simon, 1909 (type) — Australia (Western Australia)

Eupograpta

Eupograpta Raven, 2009
 E. anhat Raven, 2009 — Australia (Queensland)
 E. kottae Raven, 2009 (type) — Australia (Western Australia)

H

Hestimodema

Hestimodema Simon, 1909
 H. ambigua Simon, 1909 (type) — Australia (Western Australia)
 H. latevittata Simon, 1909 — Australia (Western Australia)

I

Israzorides

Israzorides Levy, 2003
 I. judaeus Levy, 2003 (type) — Israel

M

Mituliodon

Mituliodon Raven & Stumkat, 2003
 M. tarantulinus (L. Koch, 1873) (type) — Timor, Australia

Miturga

Miturga Thorell, 1870
 M. agelenina Simon, 1909 — Australia (Western Australia, Victoria, Tasmania)
 M. albopunctata Hickman, 1930 — Australia (Tasmania)
 M. annulipes (Lucas, 1844) — Australia
 M. australiensis (L. Koch, 1873) — Australia (New South Wales)
 M. catograpta Simon, 1909 — Australia (Western Australia)
 M. fagei Kolosváry, 1934 — Australia (New South Wales)
 M. ferina Simon, 1909 — Australia (Western Australia)
 M. gilva L. Koch, 1872 — Australia
 M. impedita Simon, 1909 — Australia (Western Australia)
 M. lineata Thorell, 1870 (type) — Australia
 M. necator (Walckenaer, 1837) — Australia (Tasmania)
 M. occidentalis Simon, 1909 — Australia (Western Australia)
 M. parva Hogg, 1914 — Australia (Western Australia)
 M. severa Simon, 1909 — Australia (Victoria)
 M. splendens Hickman, 1930 — Australia (Tasmania)
 M. thorelli Simon, 1909 — Australia (Queensland)
 M. whistleri Simon, 1909 — Australia (Western Australia)

Mitzoruga

Mitzoruga Raven, 2009
 M. elapines Raven, 2009 (type) — Australia (Queensland)
 M. insularis Raven, 2009 — Australia (Western Australia to New South Wales)
 M. marmorea (Hogg, 1896) — Australia (Northern Territory, South Australia)

N

Nuliodon

Nuliodon Raven, 2009
 N. fishburni Raven, 2009 (type) — Australia (Queensland)

O

Odomasta

Odomasta Simon, 1909
 O. guttipes (Simon, 1903) (type) — Australia (Tasmania)

P

Pacificana

Pacificana Hogg, 1904
 P. cockayni Hogg, 1904 (type) — New Zealand

Palicanus

Palicanus Thorell, 1897
 P. caudatus Thorell, 1897 (type) — India, Myanmar, China, Indonesia, Seychelles, Reunion

Parapostenus

Parapostenus Lessert, 1923
 P. hewitti Lessert, 1923 (type) — South Africa, Lesotho

Prochora

Prochora Simon, 1886
 P. lycosiformis (O. Pickard-Cambridge, 1872) (type) — Algeria, Italy (mainland, Sicily), Israel, Iran
 P. praticola (Bösenberg & Strand, 1906) — China, Korea, Japan

Pseudoceto

Pseudoceto Mello-Leitão, 1929
 P. pickeli Mello-Leitão, 1929 (type) — Brazil

S

Simonus

Simonus Ritsema, 1881
 S. lineatus (Simon, 1880) (type) — Australia (Western Australia)

† Strotarchus

† Strotarchus Simon, 1888
 † S. heidti Wunderlich, 1988 
 † S. paradoxus Petrunkevitch, 1963

Syrisca

Syrisca Simon, 1886
 S. albopilosa Mello-Leitão, 1941 — Colombia
 S. arabs Simon, 1906 — Sudan
 S. longicaudata Lessert, 1929 — Congo
 S. mamillata Caporiacco, 1941 — Ethiopia
 S. patagonica (Boeris, 1889) — Argentina
 S. pictilis Simon, 1886 (type) — Senegal
 S. russula Simon, 1886 — Ethiopia
 S. senegalensis (Walckenaer, 1841) — Senegal

Syspira

Syspira Simon, 1895
 S. agujas Brescovit, Sánchez-Ruiz & Bonaldo, 2018 — Dominican Rep.
 S. alayoni Sánchez-Ruiz, de los Santos, Brescovit & Bonaldo, 2020 — Dominican Rep.
 S. analytica Chamberlin, 1924 — USA, Mexico
 S. armasi Sánchez-Ruiz, de los Santos, Brescovit & Bonaldo, 2020 — Dominican Rep.
 S. barbacoa Sánchez-Ruiz, de los Santos, Brescovit & Bonaldo, 2020 — Dominican Rep.
 S. bryantae Sánchez-Ruiz, de los Santos, Brescovit & Bonaldo, 2020 — Dominican Rep.
 S. cimitarra Brescovit, Sánchez-Ruiz & Bonaldo, 2018 — Dominican Rep.
 S. eclectica Chamberlin, 1924 — USA, Mexico
 S. jimmyi Brescovit, Sánchez-Ruiz & Bonaldo, 2018 — Dominican Rep.
 S. longipes Simon, 1895 — Mexico
 S. medialuna Brescovit, Sánchez-Ruiz & Bonaldo, 2018 — Dominican Rep.
 S. monticola (Bryant, 1948) — Dominican Rep.
 S. pallida Banks, 1904 — USA
 S. synthetica Chamberlin, 1924 — Mexico
 S. tigrina Simon, 1895 (type) — USA, Mexico

Systaria

Systaria Simon, 1897
 S. acuminata Dankittipakul & Singtripop, 2011 — Thailand, Indonesia
 S. bifida Dankittipakul & Singtripop, 2011 — Thailand. Myanmar
 S. bifidops Jäger, 2018 — Malaysia (Peninsula)
 S. bohorokensis Deeleman-Reinhold, 2001 — Indonesia (Sumatra)
 S. bregibec Jäger, 2018 — Cambodia
 S. cervina (Simon, 1897) — Philippines
 S. decidua Dankittipakul & Singtripop, 2011 — Thailand
 S. deelemanae Dankittipakul & Singtripop, 2011 — Philippines
 S. dentata Deeleman-Reinhold, 2001 — Indonesia (Sumatra)
 S. drassiformis Simon, 1897 (type) — Indonesia (Java)
 S. elberti (Strand, 1913) — Indonesia (Lombok)
 S. gedensis Simon, 1897 — Indonesia (Java)
 S. hainanensis Zhang, Fu & Zhu, 2009 — China
 S. insolita Dankittipakul & Singtripop, 2011 — Thailand
 S. insulana (Rainbow, 1902) — Vanuatu
 S. lanna Dankittipakul & Singtripop, 2011 — Thailand
 S. lannops Jäger, 2018 — Thailand
 S. leoi (Barrion & Litsinger, 1995) — Philippines
 S. longinqua Jäger, 2018 — Laos
 S. luangprabang Jäger, 2018 — Laos
 S. mengla (Song & Zhu, 1994) — China
 S. panay Jäger, 2018 — Philippines (Panay)
 S. princesa Jäger, 2018 — Philippines (Palawan)
 S. procera Jäger, 2018 — Cambodia
 S. scapigera Dankittipakul & Singtripop, 2011 — New Guinea

T

Tamin

Tamin Deeleman-Reinhold, 2001
 T. pseudodrassus Deeleman-Reinhold, 2001 (type) — Borneo, Sulawesi
 T. simoni Deeleman-Reinhold, 2001 — Borneo

Teminius

Teminius Keyserling, 1887
 T. affinis Banks, 1897 — USA, Mexico
 T. agalenoides (Badcock, 1932) — Paraguay, Argentina
 T. hirsutus (Petrunkevitch, 1925) — Mexico to Venezuela, Caribbean
 T. insularis (Lucas, 1857) (type) — USA, Greater Antilles to Argentina

Thasyraea

Thasyraea L. Koch, 1878
 T. lepida L. Koch, 1878 — Australia (New South Wales)
 T. ornata L. Koch, 1878 (type) — Australia (Queensland)

Tuxoctenus

Tuxoctenus Raven, 2008
 T. gloverae Raven, 2008 (type) — Australia (Queensland, New South Wales)
 T. linnaei Raven, 2008 — Australia (Western, South Australia)
 T. mcdonaldae Raven, 2008 — Australia (Western Australia, Queensland)

V

Voraptus

Voraptus Simon, 1898
 V. aerius Simon, 1898 — Congo
 V. affinis Lessert, 1925 — South Africa
 V. exilipes (Lucas, 1858) — Gabon
 V. extensus Lessert, 1916 — East Africa
 V. orientalis Hogg, 1919 — Indonesia (Sumatra)
 V. tenellus (Simon, 1893) (type) — Seychelles

X

Xantharia

Xantharia Deeleman-Reinhold, 2001
 X. floreni Deeleman-Reinhold, 2001 (type) — Borneo
 X. galea Zhang, Zhang & Fu, 2010 — China
 X. murphyi Deeleman-Reinhold, 2001 — Indonesia (Sumatra)

Z

Zealoctenus

Zealoctenus Forster & Wilton, 1973
 Z. cardronaensis Forster & Wilton, 1973 (type) — New Zealand

Zora

Zora C. L. Koch, 1847
 Z. acuminata Zhu & Zhang, 2006 — China
 Z. alpina Kulczyński, 1915 — Switzerland, Italy
 Z. armillata Simon, 1878 — Europe, Caucasus, Kyrgyzstan
 Z. distincta Kulczyński, 1915 — Czechia, Slovakia, Poland, Ukraine
 Z. hespera Corey & Mott, 1991 — USA, Canada
 Z. huseynovi Zamani & Marusik, 2017 — Iran
 Z. lyriformis Song, Zhu & Gao, 1993 — China
 Z. manicata Simon, 1878 — Europe, Israel, Iran
 Z. nemoralis (Blackwall, 1861) — Europe, Caucasus, Russia (Europe to South Siberia, Kamchatka), Kazakhstan, Iran, Turkmenistan, Mongolia, China, Korea, Japan
 Z. opiniosa (O. Pickard-Cambridge, 1872) — Lebanon
 Z. palmgreni Holm, 1945 — Sweden, Finland
 Z. parallela Simon, 1878 — Europe, Russia (Europe, Far East)
 Z. pardalis Simon, 1878 — Europe, Caucasus, Kazakhstan
 Z. prespaensis Drensky, 1929 — North Macedonia
 Z. pumila (Hentz, 1850) — USA
 Z. silvestris Kulczyński, 1897 — Europe, Caucasus, Turkmenistan
 Z. spinimana (Sundevall, 1833) (type) — Europe, Turkey, Caucasus, Russia (Europe to Far East), Kazakhstan, Iran, Central Asia, China, Japan

Zoroides

Zoroides Berland, 1924
 Z. dalmasi Berland, 1924 (type) — New Caledonia

References

Miturgidae